Ware & Treganza was a leading American architectural firm in the intermountain west during the late 19th and early 20th century.  It was a partnership of Walter E. Ware and Alberto O. Treganza and operated in Salt Lake City, Utah.

They designed civic buildings, churches and homes, many of which are in Prairie School style and are listed on the U.S. National Register of Historic Places.  Ware & Treganza also offered training to many other architects including Taylor Woolley, Leslie S. Hodgson, and Georgious Y. Cannon.  Ware and Treganza were not 
adherents to the predominant Mormon faith in early 20th century Utah and the 17th Ward Chapel (now demolished) and the Maeser Building on the campus of Brigham Young University are the only known contracts awarded to the firm by the church.

Images of selected works

Other works
Almon A. Covey House, 1211 E. 100 South, Salt Lake City, UT  *NRHP listed 
Converse Hall (Westminster College), 1840 S. 13th East, Salt Lake City, UT  *NRHP listed 
Hyrum T. Covey House, 1229 E. 100 South, Salt Lake City, UT  *NRHP listed 
Green River Presbyterian Church, 134 W. Third Ave., Green River, UT  *NRHP listed 
Park Hotel, 422-432 W. 300 South, Salt Lake City, UT  *NRHP listed 
Smith Apartments, 228 S. 300 East, Salt Lake City, UT  *NRHP listed 
Springville Carnegie Library, 175 S. Main St., Springville, UT  *NRHP listed 
One or more works in Utah State Fair Grounds, Salt Lake City, UT  *NRHP listed 
One or more works in University Neighborhood Historic District, Roughly bounded by 500 S., S. Temple, 100 E. and University St., Salt Lake City, UT  *NRHP listed 
17th Ward Chapel (demolished)
Samuel C. Sherrill House
Dr. Samuel H. Allen House
Caithness Apartments
Murphy House
Frank M. Cameron House
B.B. Grey House

References

Architecture firms of the United States
Architects from Salt Lake City